The Malindi Kingdom was a Bantu civilization on the eastern coast of Africa, in modern Kenya, from approximately the 9th through 15th centuries. It was a noteworthy cultural and trade crossroads between the Bantu and Arab peoples, and also traded with Ming China, India, and Portugal; pottery from all three regions has been found there dating to between the 13th and 15th centuries.

Knowledge of this kingdom became available when the Communist Chinese government took interest in stories of exploration by 14th century diplomat Zheng He, now  a national hero, and began sponsoring archeological digs of sites in places like modern Malindi and Mambrui. Zheng He does indeed appear to have traveled at least this far, before trade was banned by the bureaucracy of the Ming dynasty and most records of that exploration destroyed.

History
Old Town Malindi may have been somewhat north of the modern city. There is some dispute as to whether the kingdom itself was centered initially around Old Town Malindi, or Mambrui. The general settlement of this region seems to date back to about 850 AD. Old town Malindi seems to have been destroyed around 1000 AD, but resettled by 1250.

Chinese texts as early as the 9th century name far-western ports with names that, phonetically, seem similar, or in one case identical, to Malindi, but it is uncertain whether they do indeed refer to the African kingdom, centuries before the Zheng He voyages. At that time, the Ajuran Empire north of Malindi does indeed appear to have been trading with China, as coins from as early as the Song Dynasty having been recovered at appropriate levels in modern Somalia.

The kingdom appears to have thrived from 1250 through the appearance of Vasco de Gama in the 15th century, when colonization of the region seems to have caused a decline.

References

Malindi
Bantu peoples
Ming dynasty writers
Countries in medieval Africa
Trade routes
History of Kenya